The National Patriotic Front of Liberia-Central Revolutionary Council (NPFL-CRC) was a rebel group that participated in the First Liberian Civil War. The group emerged in mid-1994 and was a breakaway faction of the National Patriotic Front of Liberia (NPFL), which was led by Charles Taylor.

Prominent figures in the NPFL-CRC were Sam Dokie and Tom Woewiyu, a defense chief in Taylor's alternative government based in the Bong County town of Gbarnga. Both men cited strategic and ideological differences as the cause of their defection.

The NPFL-CRC did engage in small battles with the NPFL around Gbarnga and northern Liberia, but was not a major force in the conflict.

History of Liberia
Rebel groups in Liberia